Carlile House, formerly Costley Training Institute, was a boys' home and training centre, built in 1886. It was enabled by a bequest of £12,500 from Edward Costley. It was originally bequest to the Kohimarama Training School, however, the Kohimarama Training School had since closed. The trustees recommended that a training institution should be established and Sir Robert Stout prepared a Bill that passed without opposition, entitled "The Costley Training Institution Act, 1885".

History 
Carlile House, as Costley Training Institute, housed residents who were apprenticed to a range of trades from 1886. The land was bought for £1025, the buildings constructed for £2830, and furnished and landscaped for £703. Following the closure of the Auckland Industrial School in 1896, numbers of residents reduced and the Institute was closed in 1908.

From 1908 for over twenty years, it was then the Richmond Road Children’s Home. Following the 1931 Hawkes Bay earthquake, it housed Hukarere Maori Girls’ School until 1932. From 1935 to 1969, when it housed the headquarters and training school of the Church Army, founded by Wilson Carlile, and was thus renamed Carlile House. In the early 1970s, Carlile house was a remand home run by the Department of Social Welfare, and in 1973 became the Auckland Alternative School. In 1976–77, a Tongan Community Group bought Carlile House, and it is currently owned by United Church Tonga.

There are several stories about fires and deaths at Carlile House in the early 1900s, as none have been found reported in newspapers, it is likely that these are not true.

In 2002, dance performances The Carlile House Project and Strange Fruit, were awarded funding from Auckland City Council's creative communities initiative, and put on a week of performances in the building. The performances used five rooms within the house to explore "to explore New Zealand immigration issues through the eyes of a girl," particularly focused on Tongans immigrating to New Zealand from the 1950s to the present day.

Architecture 
 

Carlile House is a two-storey late Victorian building of an Italianate style, built in brick with limestone dressings. It is an H-plan layout. The façade has two projecting wings with arched windows and a central single-storey columned portico in the middle with the name "Carlile House" above the entrance. The exterior is decorated with stone, including "horizontal bands and quoins, cornices, brackets, window surrounds, keystones, heads and sills [which] are made with sandstone." The main entrance portico originally had a solid plaster or stone balustrade with end piers and urns over the entablature and pilasters." The windows are sash windows, segmental arched windows on the ground floor and semi-circular arches on the upper floor on the front, north facing façade, with those "at the ends of the projecting wings are framed with pilasters supporting an entablature." Windows on the back of the building are rectangular.

In August 1886, not long after the Institute opened, the New Zealand Herald described the then Costley Training Institute's interior as having:"a commodious dining room, and sitting room for use of lads, on the ground floor, where are also situated managers quarters, kitchen, pantry, scullery, storerooms, etc. On the upper floor there are six bedrooms and a commodious room, reserved for infirmary, if necessary, having beautiful views. All the baths have hot or cold water laid on, and the lavatories are of the most approved pattern. It is intended to commence the formation of a library, provision being made for it in a recess in the sitting-room. Gas is laid on throughout the building. The situation of the Institute is pleasant and healthful, being at the bend of the Richmond Road, and the institution has an acre of ground attached."

Alterations 
In 1891 and 1898, two single-storey buildings, the workshop and the gymnasium respectively, were added. Two further additions were added to the rear in 1910, including a whole new wing toe provided additional dormitories and bathrooms, and a large hall. In 1913, a memorial chapel was constructed for Sister Cecil (Order of the Good Shepherd) who had managed the facility from 1909 until her death in 1912. In 1916, the verandah on the west side was covered and used as a play area. In 1978, the chapel was altered to be able to hold 300 worshippers, and dedicated to late Tongan queen, Sālote Tupou III, forming the first Tongan Church in the city. In the mid to late twentieth-century metal clad shed was also added behind the building.

Current state 
Carlile House is a Category 1 Historic Place. However, it is currently in a dilapidated state, and considered a dangerous building. There is both interior and exterior water damage, most of the windows are without glazing, there are few downpipes, the corrugated iron on the roof is deteriorating and fires in 2003 and 2013 have destroyed much of the interior. It has been estimated to cost $7 and $10 million to repair Carlile House, and there is contention between Auckland Council and the United Church of Tonga as to the future of the building.

References 

Heritage New Zealand Category 1 historic places in the Auckland Region
1886 establishments in New Zealand
Educational institutions established in 1886
Schools in Auckland